Barb Galler-Smith is a Canadian science fiction and fantasy author living in Edmonton, Alberta.

Her published works include The Druid Saga series of historical fantasy novels, including Druids, Captives and Warrior. Druids was shortlisted for the Aurora Award "Best Novel in English" category in 2012.

Galler-Smith is a member of SF Canada, Canada's national association of science fiction and fantasy authors.

References

External links

Canadian science fiction writers
Canadian fantasy writers
Canadian women novelists
Writers from Edmonton
Living people
Women science fiction and fantasy writers
Year of birth missing (living people)